Swamir Ghar ( Husband's house) is a 1999 Bengali film directed by Swapan Saha.The film has music composed by Anupam Dutta.

Cast
 Soumitra Chatterjee
 Prosenjit Chatterjee
 Rituparna Sengupta
 Kaushik Banerjee
 Bodhisattwa Majumdar
 Nandini Maliya
 Bhaskar Banerjee
 Moyna Mukherjee

References

External links
 Swamir Ghar at the Gomolo

1999 drama films
1999 films
Bengali-language Indian films
Films scored by Anupam Dutta
1990s Bengali-language films
Films directed by Swapan Saha
Indian drama films